State Road 226 (NM 226) is a , paved, two-lane state highway in Doña Ana County in the U.S. state of New Mexico. NM 226's western terminus is north of Chamberino at the road's junction with NM 28. The road's eastern terminus is near Berino at the road's junction with NM 478. The road continues as East Berino Road past the junction with NM 478. NM 226 is also known as West Berino Road.

Route description
The highway begins at the junction with NM 28 north of Chamberino, right after NM 28 crosses the Westside Canal. The road heads east-northeast through pecan orchards and fields of Mesilla Valley and after approximately  crosses the Rio Grande river over a  bridge, built in 1941. The highway travels east-northeast, before turning east. Approximately  farther, NM 226 reaches the western outskirts of the community of Berino. NM 226 crosses railroad tracks of El Paso Subdivision of BNSF Railway right before reaching its eastern terminus at intersection with NM 478.

History
The section occupied by modern day NM 226 was constructed in the early 1940s as one of the spurs connecting NM 28 with agricultural communities lying along U.S. Route 85 (US 85). In late 1950s this stretch was designated as NM 226.

Major intersections

See also

References

External links

226
Transportation in Doña Ana County, New Mexico